Joe MacBeth is a 1955 British–American crime drama, directed by Ken Hughes and starring Paul Douglas, Ruth Roman and Bonar Colleano. It is a modern retelling of Shakespeare's Macbeth, set in a 1930s American criminal underworld. The film's plot closely follows that of Shakespeare's original play. It has been called "the first really stand out movie" of Hughes' career.

A similar adaptation, Men of Respect, was released in 1990, starring John Turturro, Rod Steiger and Dennis Farina.

Plot
Mob trigger man Joe "Mac" MacBeth assassinates Tommy, second-in-command to crime boss "Duke" Duca, on Duke's orders and then proceeds to his own wedding, where his bride Lily scolds him for being two hours late. As they celebrate their marriage that night at Duke's nightclub, fortune teller Rosie declares that Joe's destiny is to become the kingpin of the mob. The ruthlessly ambitious Lily is convinced of the fortune's inevitability, but Joe brushes it off. Almost immediately after Rosie leaves, however, Duke arrives and rewards Joe with a promotion to Tommy's old position and his prized lakeside mansion.

Duke's mob soon goes to war with a rival outfit run by the gluttonous Big Dutch. After Big Dutch's men turn the tables and make inroads on Duke's territory, Joe pays the rival boss a personal visit at a restaurant and secretly poisons a dish. Once Joe departs, Big Dutch devours the tainted food, then dies on the spot.

During an overnight party at the lakeside mansion to celebrate Big Dutch's demise, Lily continues to goad Joe into going after Duke, but Joe hesitates. The festivities end with Duke inviting Lily to go for a swim. Once in the water, Joe stabs his boss in the back and holds him under until he is dead, but he is shaken by the act and fails to remove the knife, forcing Lily to dive in and recover the murder weapon. In the morning, when Duke's bodyguards come to pick him up and he cannot be found, Lily claims to have discovered Duke's robe by the lake and suggests he drowned while swimming. Joe is immediately elevated to kingpin and he promotes his friend Banky to his right-hand man.

Banky's son Lennie resents Joe's rapid rise, asserting that his father served Duke long before Joe came along. He also openly casts suspicion on Duke's death. The loyal Banky beats Lennie for the insubordination, but urges Joe to set his son up with a small business so that his family can leave the criminal life. Later, Joe and Banky come across Rosie again, and she claims Joe is being overshadowed by his friend. The men laugh off Rosie's words, but shortly after, Joe hires a pair of hitmen from out of town to eliminate Banky and Lennie; Banky dies, but Lennie escapes, and Lily berates Joe for not doing the job himself.

At a banquet where Lennie unexpectedly shows up, Joe begins to be haunted by nightmares and visions of the men he betrayed. Lennie entertains plans of usurping Joe as the latter's erratic behavior disturbs the rank-and-file members. Meanwhile, Joe sends the hitmen to kidnap Lennie's wife, Ruth, and their daughter to rein the upstart in, but they botch the job. Lily discovers the bodies when she visits Ruth's house and is traumatized. The brutal act also alienates Marty, Joe's last ally in the mob.

That night, Marty warns Joe that Lennie is coming for him. Joe orders the hitmen to guard the mansion while he tends to Lily, but the mercenaries decide to make a run for it and are gunned down by Lennie. Panicked and paranoid, Joe closes himself in a dark room with a machine gun and starts shooting wildly at the slightest movements. When the doors to the room open, he fires at them and kills Lily. As Joe rushes to his wife's side, Lennie then personally executes Joe. Angus, the mansion's longtime butler, suggests that Lennie is the new master of the mansion and therefore the mob, but Lennie disagrees and tells Angus to look for a new job.

Cast
 Paul Douglas as Joe MacBeth
 Ruth Roman as Lily MacBeth
 Bonar Colleano as Lennie
 Grégoire Aslan as Duca, a.k.a. "The Duke"
 Sid James as Banky
 Harry Green as Big Dutch
 Walter Crisham as Angus
 Kay Callard as Ruth
 Robert Arden as Ross
 George Margo as Second Assassin
 Minerva Pious as Rosie
 Philip Vickers as Tommy
 Mark Baker as Benny
 Bill Nagy as Marty
 Nicholas Stuart as Duffy
 Teresa Thorne as Ruth
 Shirley Douglas as Patsy
 Alfred Mulock as First Assassin
 Louise Grant
 Beresford Egan

Production
In 1941, it was announced Philip Yordan had written a play Joe MacBeth which updated Shakespeare's play to the Chicago gang wars. Arthur Vinton was considering producing.

In February 1942, director William Dieterle said he was trying to finance Joe MacBeth. The following month, Yordan announced Dieterle would direct the stage version, which would open in New York on 25 August. The production did not happen. In March 1946, Yordan was still discussing it as a possibility.

In February 1947, it was announced that United California Productions, a company formed by Robert Cummings, Philip Yordan and Eugene Frenke, had bought the rights to Joe MacBeth, based on an original screenplay by Philip Yordan. Yordan wrote the film as a vehicle for Cummings. The movie would be distributed by United Artists. By April, Cummings had dropped out. Frenke was discussing producing the play at the Pasadena Playhouse. In September 1947, Cummings announced he had shelved plans to make the film so it did not have to compete with the Orson Welles film of MacBeth.

In June 1948, James Nasser announced he had acquired rights to Joe MacBeth for filming under his deal with United Artists. It was to be directed by Lloyd Bacon and star Lew Ayres and Audrey Totter with filming to start in August. Filming did not happen. In January 1949, Yordan said the film had been unable to get off the ground due to troubles finding the right cast. In August, William Bacher  was reportedly seeking Shelley Winters to play a lead.

In October 1954, Mike Frankovich announced he had purchased the screen rights. Frankovich and writer Philip Yordan had previously collaborated on Anna Lucasta. Filming was likely to be done for United Artists with Joanne Dru and John Ireland, then married, as possible stars. Frankovich ended up making the movie under a deal he had with Columbia and in April 1955, Paul Douglas, not Ireland, agreed to star. Douglas arranged this as the first of a two-picture deal with Columbia, the second to be The Gamma People (his wife, Jan Sterling, signed to make 1984 in England at the same time). Filming on Joe MacBeth would start 1 May 1955. Ruth Roman signed to play the female lead.

French actor Gregoire Aslan was cast as a gangster.

It was the last film Mike Frankovich made as independent producer before running Columbia's British operations.

Hughes later said he "enjoyed" making the film. "I was terribly young, only 22. The cheek I had to be directing old timers like Paul Douglas and Richard Conte. Still, I think they liked that and I tried never to be arrogant. And it was one of the few scripts I picked up in my life that didn't require a great deal of work."

Reception

Critical response
Critical reception to the film in England was harsh.

Author Geoff Mayer wrote in his book Historical Dictionary of Crime Films: "Although this bizarre gangster film was an attempt to update William Shakespeare's play to contemporary America ... less-than-subtle alterations to the play with name changes..."

The Variety staff of Variety wrote in their review: "Joe Macbeth is far removed from the famous Shakespearean character, but there is an analogy between this modern gangster story and the Bard’s classic play. Although made in Britain, the film has an American setting. It is expensively mounted, expertly staged and directed with a keen sense of tension."

References

Citations

Sources

External links

Joe Macbeth at BFI

1955 films
1955 crime drama films
Films directed by Ken Hughes
Films based on Macbeth
British crime drama films
Films set in the 1930s
Films set in the United States
Columbia Pictures films
1950s English-language films
1950s British films
American crime drama films
British black-and-white films
American black-and-white films